"Do You Really Like It?" is a song by UK garage music group DJ Pied Piper and the Masters of Ceremonies. The single went to number one on the UK Singles Chart in June 2001. The song has sold over 600,000 copies in the United Kingdom according to the British Phonographic Industry.

The song was interpolated in "Really Love" by KSI featuring Craig David and Digital Farm Animals which reached No. 3 in the UK in October 2020. DJ Pied Piper and the Masters of Ceremonies are therefore credited as co-songwriters on the song.

Track listings
UK CD single
 "Do You Really Like It?" (radio edit)
 "Do You Really Like It?" (full length original version)
 "Do You Really Like It?" (accapella)
 "Do You Really Like It?" (video)

UK cassette single
 "Do You Really Like It?" (radio edit)
 "Do You Really Like It?" (full length original version)

European maxi-CD single
 "Do You Really Like It?" (radio edit) – 3:22
 "Do You Really Like It?" (full length original version) – 5:31
 "Do You Really Like It?" (accapella) – 0:28
 "Do You Really Like It?" (full length Sovereign mix vocal) – 5:59
 "Do You Really Like It?" (vocal dub PA) – 6:01

Australian CD single
 "Do You Really Like It?" (radio edit)
 "Do You Really Like It?" (full length Sovereign mix vocal)
 "Do You Really Like It?" (full length original version)
 "Do You Really Like It?" (accapella)

Charts

Weekly charts

Year-end charts

Decade-end charts

Certifications

Release history

References

2001 songs
2001 debut singles
Ministry of Sound singles
Relentless Records singles
UK garage songs
UK Singles Chart number-one singles